"Thunderous" ("Singer" (of Pansori)) is a song recorded by South Korean boy band Stray Kids. It was released as the second track of their second studio album Noeasy, and serves as its lead single on August 23, 2021, through JYP Entertainment, and distributed by Dreamus. Written by 3Racha, a production team from members of Stray Kids and HotSauce, the song is described as a hip hop, and trap song with the elements of Korean traditional music (gugak), and brass instruments, expresses the firm belief that they will not be discouraged and keep to their principles no matter what anyone says. 

Commercially, the song debuted at number 33 on the Gaon Digital Chart, making their highest charting song ever, number 3 on the Billboard World Digital Song Sales, number 80 on the Global 200. It was promoted on several South Korean music programs and took six wins from music programs, such as Show Champion, M Countdown, Music Bank, and Inkigayo. The accompanying music video reached 100 million views in 55 days after being uploaded, making it their fifth and fastest to hit 100-million-view music video. The Japanese version (Sorikun) was released on October 13, together with "Scars" as a double A-side single, through Epic Records Japan. It peaked at number 2 on the Oricon Singles Chart.

Background and release

On July 22, 2021, Stray Kids announced to release the second studio album Noeasy, set to be released on August 23, 2021 with the "Thunderous" trailer. The full track listing was released on August 12, and announced "Thunderous" will serve as a title track of the album. The music video teasers were released on August 20–21, and the performance video teaser with SKZoo costume on the following day. and the performance video teaser with SKZoo costume on the following day. The song was released on the same day with the album and accompanying music video.

Composition

"Thunderous" was written by the group's production team 3Racha (Bang Chan, Changbin, Han), and JYP in-house production team HotSauce, is a hip hop and trap song that includes various elements of Korean traditional music (gugak), brass instruments, and chuimsae. The song composed in the key of C♯ major, 172 beats per minute with a running time of 3 minutes and 3 seconds. The Korean title "Sori-kkun" has a dual meaning of jansori-kkun means "nagger", and sori-kkun means "singer" of pansori. As generation Z, the song expresses the firm belief that they will not be discouraged and keep to their principles no matter what anyone says. According to the interview, Felix, a member of the group said the concept of "Thunderous" can described as "black and red", and "dokkaebi". Bang Chan also said, "The message of the song is that Stray Kids, as sorikkun (singer), will face off against the jansorikkun (naggers), and confidently let loose our sound."

Commercial performance

"Thunderous" debuted at number 33 on the thirty-fifth week of South Korea's Gaon Digital Chart for the issue date of August 22–28, 2021, make their highest charting song ever, and number 90 on the Billboard K-pop 100. In Japan, the song entered at number 88. In Malaysia, the song peaked at number 14 on Top 20 Most Streamed Songs. In Singapore, the song debuted at number 24 on the RIAS Top Streaming Chart. 

In Hungary, the debuted at number 7 on Single Top 40. In the United Kingdom, the song debuted at number 80 on the Official Charts Company's Album Downloads Chart, and number 82 on the Singles Sales Chart for the chart issue date of August 27 – September 2, 2021, becoming the group's first-ever song to appear on the charts. In the United States, the song debuted at number 3 on the World Digital Song Sales for the chart issue date of September 4, 2021. The song also debuted at 80 on the Billboard Global 200.

Music video

The accompanying music video of "Thunderous" was premiered on August 24, 2021 to YouTube, Naver TV, and V Live. The music video teasers were released on August 20–21, Directed by Bang Jae-yeob, and shoot in cinematic scale, the music video mash-up Korean historical and modern styles, like sports cars in front of the palace, Stray Kids wearing modern clothes among the people in hanbok. It included Korean traditional culture like aak, pungmul nori, Bukcheong lion mask, etc. 

On August 30, the music video uploaded on YouTube reached 50 million views in 6 days. It surpassed 100 million views on October 18, for 55 days, making it the group's fifth 100-million-view music video, following "God's Menu", "Back Door", "Miroh", and "My Pace", and their fastest music video to hit the milestone, surpassing "God's Menu" with 71 days, and 200 million views on May 11, 2022.

Live performance

"Thunderous" was performed for the first time at a showcase held on the same day as the release date, as part of Kingdom Week <No+>, a television variety show that benefits the winner of Kingdom: Legendary War. The song was also promoted on several music programs in South Korea for three weeks, August 26 – September 12, including M Countdown, Music Bank, Show! Music Core, Inkigayo, and Show Champion, along with "The View" in the first week of promotion, except Music Bank, and "Secret Secret" at Show! Music Core on September 4. 

"Thunderous" was also performed at several awards ceremonies, including 2021 The Fact Music Awards on October 2; the 2021 Asia Artist Awards on December 2; the 2021 Mnet Asian Music Awards, arranged in the "hero" version as part of medley, titled Stray Kids World Domination; 36th Golden Disc Awards with new arrangement on January 8, 2022. At the year-end annual music shows, "Thunderous" was performed at the 2021 KBS Song Festival on December 17, which shot at Namhansanseong, Gwangju, Gyeonggi Province with the theme With K-Culture, collaborated K-pop and K-cultural asset; 2021 SBS Gayo Daejeon on December 25, which arranged in Christmas version, and additionally using canes, group dance, and parodying Squid Game ttakji, and dalgona game; and 2021 MBC Gayo Daejejeon on December 31, adding ringing New Year's bell performance before New Year ceremony.

As an ambassador for the Korea Pavilion of Expo 2020, held at Dubai, United Arab Emirates, Stray Kids performed "Thunderous", as part of the opening show of the Korea Pavilion's Korea National Day with the Little Angels, and K-Tigers on January 17, 2022. The group also performed "Thunderous", alongside "Miroh", "God's Menu", and "Back Door" at the Korea National Day K-Pop Concert on the same day, joining Forestella, (G)I-dle, Golden Child, Sunmi, and Psy.

Japanese version

On July 30, 2021, Stray Kids announced to release the second Japanese single on October 13 with five physical editions: three first press limited (A, B, C), regular, and FC. On September 10, The Japanese version of "Thunderous", titled , was announced to release as a double A-side single in Japan together with "Scars". It was pre-released on September 23 to digital music, and streaming platform. The performance music was premiered on September 23.

Stray Kids gave the debut performance of "Thunderous (Japanese ver.)" on TBS's CDTV Live! Live! on October 4, and also performed on 35th anniversary special episode of TV Asahi's Music Station on October 15, as well as Nippon TV's Buzz Rhythm 02 on October 31. The Japanese version entered Billboard Japan Hot 100 at number 66. The double A-side single with "Scars" debuted at number two on the Oricon Singles Chart, selling 119,963 copies in the first week, surpassing 37,157 copies of "Top" (Japanese ver.). The single also entered Billboard Japan Top Single Sales at number two, selling 182,405 copies in its first week.

Track listing

Notes

  In first press limited edition B, "Thunderous" (Japanese version) is switched to be the first track, and "Scars" to be the second track.
  Signifies an additional lyricist
 "Call" is stylized in all caps

Credits and personnel

Credits adapted from Melon and the Japanese CD single liner notes.

Locations

 Originally published at JYP Publishing (KOMCA), Sony Music Publishing (Japan) Inc. (Japanese version)
 Recorded at JYPE Studios (Seoul)
 Mixed at Chapel Swing Studios (Valley Glen)
 Mastered at 821 Sound Mastering (Seoul)

Personnel

 Stray Kids – lead vocals
 Bang Chan (3Racha) – lyrics, composition, arrangement
 Changbin (3Racha) – lyrics, composition
 Han (3Racha) – lyrics, composition
 KM-Markit – lyrics (Japanese version)
 HotSauce – composition, arrangement, keyboard, drum programming, computer programming, digital editing
 KayOne Lee – digital editing
 Lee Sang-yeob – recording
 Lim Hong-jin – recording (Korean version)
 Eom Se-hee – recording (Japanese version)
 Tony Maserati – mixing
 David K. Younghyun – mix engineering
 Kwon Nam-woo – mastering

Accolades

Charts

Weekly charts

Monthly charts

Year-end charts

Certifications and sales

Release history

See also

 List of Inkigayo Chart winners (2021)
 List of M Countdown Chart winners (2021)
 List of Music Bank Chart winners (2021)
 List of Show Champion Chart winners (2021)

References

2021 singles
2021 songs
JYP Entertainment singles
Korean-language songs
Stray Kids songs
Songs about fame